HD 189276 is a single star in the northern constellation Cygnus, positioned near the northern constellation border with Draco. It has an orange hue and is faintly visible to the naked eye with an apparent visual magnitude of 4.98. The star is located at a distance of approximately 820 light years from the Sun based on parallax, and it has an absolute magnitude of −2.25. It is drifting further away with a radial velocity of +4 km/s.

This is an aging star on the red giant branch with a stellar classification of K4.5IIIa. With the supply of hydrogen at its exhausted, it has cooled and expanded to 178 times the girth of the Sun. This is an active star that appears to be approaching the tip of the red-giant branch. Interferometric measurements of the star suggest significant departures from symmetry. HD 189276 has four times the mass of the Sun and is radiating 1,533 times the Sun's luminosity from its bloated photosphere at an effective temperature of 3,940.

References

K-type giants
Runaway stars
Cygnus (constellation)
BD+58 2013
189276
189276
7633
J19555536+5850454